EQ Pegasi (also known as Gliese 896) is a nearby binary system of two red dwarfs.  Both components are flare stars, with spectral types of M4Ve and M6Ve respectively, and a current separation between the components of 5.8 arcseconds.  The system is at a distance of 20.4 light-years, and is 950 million years old. The primary star is orbited by one known exoplanet.

Discovery
EQ Pegasi was first noticed to be a binary star by Carl A. Wirtanen who in the course of a systematic survey of the McCormick Observatory photographic plates for M-type dwarfs, detected a companion about two magnitudes fainter at a separation of 3.5 arcseconds.

Both components are also thought to be single-lined spectroscopic binaries, with faint companions that have not been resolved in orbits of a few years.

Planetary system

In 2022, a Jovian planet was discovered in orbit around the system's primary star via radio astrometry. Along with the planet around TVLM 513-46546, this is the first confirmed exoplanet discovered entirely using astrometry.

In culture
In 1998, it was the basis of a hoax, as a telecommunications company claimed it had discovered "alien" signals originating from the star.

Gallery

References

Pegasus (constellation)
Binary stars
M-type main-sequence stars
0896
Pegasi, EQ
116132
J23315208+1956142
Durchmusterung objects
Emission-line stars
Planetary systems with one confirmed planet